Tolisavac is a village in Serbia. It is situated in the Krupanj municipality, in the Mačva District of Central Serbia. The village had a population of 667 in 2002, all of whom were ethnic Serbs.

Historical population

1948: 1,144
1953: 1,179
1961: 1,052
1971: 964
1981: 844
1991: 824
2002: 667

References

See also
List of places in Serbia

Populated places in Mačva District